Sangemarmar Sar, or Sangemar Mar and Sang-e-Marmar, is a pyramidal peak in the Batura Muztagh, at the end of a spur ridge running southwest from Pasu Sar in Pakistan. It lies between the Muchuhar Glacier, on the west, and the Shispare (or Hasanabad) Glacier on the east.

Overview
Because it is much lower in elevation than many of the surrounding peaks, such as Batura Sar and Rakaposhi, Sangemarmar Sar is little-known, and there has been only one successful ascent of the peak, according to the Himalayan Index. However, because of its location on the southern flank of the main crest of the range, relatively near the Hunza Valley, it does enjoy tremendous vertical relief above local terrain.

The mountain was named (as "Sangemarmur", meaning in Persian "ore/ heart of marble", after a conspicuous
band of yellow marble crossing the summit) in 1964 by the First Canadian Himalayan Expedition, comprising Fred Roots (leader), Donald Lyon, John Ricker, Lisle Irwin, Donald Poole, Hermann Jamek, Momin Khalifa and Karl Tomm. They intended to locate and climb Hachindar Chhish, which they determined to be a peak a few kilometers to the west of Sangemarmar Sar; however that peak proved too difficult and technical for the party to attempt. The expedition reached  but was then forced to retreat by repeated heavy snowstorms.

On July 11, 1984, a team from Osaka University made the first ascent of the mountain via the southwest ridge. The expedition comprised Takashi Matsuo (leader), Hiromi Okuyama, Takehiro Hirota, Tokio Kozuki, Masaya Oishi, Toru Sakakibara, Kenya Sato, Shinichi Miyata, Tomoyoshi Mizukawa, Hiroyuki Onishi, and Akira Noguchi. All members reached the summit, on two separate days. They encountered ice up to 50 degrees. They used three high camps, and fixed  of rope.

See also
 List of mountains in Pakistan

References

 Himalayan Index
 DEM files for the Himalaya (Corrected versions of SRTM data; look for the "Batura Sar" tile)

Mountains of Gilgit-Baltistan
Six-thousanders of the Karakoram